Jon Vega Villasante (born 8 June 1994) is a Spanish footballer who plays for SD Leioa as a centre back.

Football career
Born in Miranda de Ebro, Province of Burgos, Vega played youth football with local CD Mirandés, and made his senior debuts with the reserves in the 2012–13 season. On 12 September 2013 he made his professional debut, starting in a 1–1 away loss against CD Lugo for the season's Copa del Rey (3–4 on penalties).

On 11 July 2015 Vega moved to Coruxo FC in Segunda División B.

References

External links
Mirandés' official profile 

1994 births
Living people
Spanish footballers
Footballers from Castile and León
Association football defenders
Segunda División B players
Tercera División players
CD Mirandés B players
CD Mirandés footballers
Coruxo FC players
SD Leioa players
UB Conquense footballers